The 2020 Libertarian Party presidential primaries and caucuses were a series of electoral contests to indicate non-binding preferences for the Libertarian Party's presidential candidate in the 2020 United States presidential election. These differ from the Republican or Democratic presidential primaries and caucuses in that they do not appoint delegates to represent a candidate at the party's convention to select the party's presidential nominee.

The party's nominee was subsequently chosen directly by registered delegates at the 2020 Libertarian National Convention, held through an online convention from May 22 to May 24. Jo Jorgensen was chosen as the party's presidential nominee, becoming the first woman to receive the Libertarian nomination, after four rounds of voting. Spike Cohen was nominated for vice president.

Background 
The 2020 United States presidential election was the thirteenth contested presidential election in which the Libertarian Party participated. The 2016 election saw the highest vote total and percentage of votes for a Libertarian presidential ticket ever, with former New Mexico governor Gary Johnson and his running mate, former Massachusetts governor Bill Weld, receiving over four million votes and 3.3% of the total vote. During his presidential campaign in 2016, Johnson often stated that it would be his last run for the presidency.

Candidates 
Major candidates have been invited to participate in at least two Libertarian Party-sponsored debates or have received substantial independent media coverage.

Nominee

Eliminated in convention balloting

Withdrew during the primaries

Withdrew before the primaries

Formed exploratory committee but did not run

Declined to be candidates 
These individuals have been the subject of presidential speculation, but have publicly denied or recanted interest in running for president.
 Patrick Byrne, CEO and founder of Overstock.com from Indiana
 Tom Campbell, former U.S. Representative from California (1989–1993, 1995–2001) (endorsed Jim Gray)
 Kmele Foster, telecommunications entrepreneur and TV host from New York (endorsed Justin Amash)
 Gary Johnson, Republican Governor of New Mexico (1995–2003), nominee for president in 2012 and 2016, nominee for U.S. senator from New Mexico in 2018
 Thomas Massie, Republican U.S. representative from Kentucky (2012–present)
 Darryl W. Perry, radio host and candidate for President in 2016 (endorsed Kim Ruff)
 Austin Petersen, candidate for President in 2016, Republican candidate for U.S. Senate from Missouri in 2018
 Mary Ruwart, candidate for president in 1984 and 2008, candidate for vice president in 1992, nominee for U.S. Senate from Texas in 2000
 Mark Sanford, Republican U.S. representative from South Carolina (2013–2019) (ran for the Republican Party nomination)
 Nicholas Sarwark, attorney and chair of the Libertarian National Committee (2014–2020), candidate for Mayor of Phoenix in 2018
 Larry Sharpe, businessman, motivational speaker, and nominee for Governor of New York in 2018 (ran for Vice President)
 Jesse Ventura, Reform Governor of Minnesota (1999–2003) (considered running for Green Party nomination)
 Bill Weld, Republican Governor of Massachusetts (1991–1997) and nominee for Vice President in 2016 (ran for the Republican Party nomination)

Timeline of the race

2017 
 November 25: Zoltan Istvan announces his intention to run.

2018 
 January 18: Adam Kokesh officially launches his campaign at an event in Texas, having already announced his intention to run for president during a jailhouse interview in 2013. On the day of his announcement, Kokesh was stopped twice by Texas state troopers, and placed under arrest and charged with possession of a controlled substance and tampering with evidence.
 May 28: Perennial candidate and performance artist Vermin Supreme files to run.
  June 3: Contrary to an assertion he made at the 2016 convention, John McAfee announces via Twitter that he would run for president again in 2020, either with the Libertarian Party or under the banner of a party of his own creation.
 July 3: Former Vice Chair of the Libertarian National Committee, Arvin Vohra announces his candidacy, after an unsuccessful bid for re-election to his position as vice chair.
 August 26: Chair of the Horry County Libertarian party and 2016 presidential candidate Keenan Dunham files to run.
 October 19: After having been asked during a Q&A session a few days prior if he would be interested in running for president as a Libertarian, Overstock.com CEO Patrick Byrne indicates that he "almost definitely" was not going to run for president in 2020.
 December 12: Vice chair of the L.P. Radical Caucus Kim Ruff expresses interest in a run.

2019 
 January 3: Biomedical researcher and candidate for the party's 2008 presidential nomination Mary Ruwart confirmed on Twitter that she was not planning on seeking the nomination on 2020 in order to focus on writing.
 January 11: Zoltan Istvan announced via his website that he had left the Libertarian Party some time before this date, and was no longer seeking its nomination for president in 2020.
 January 20: At-the-time Republican representative Justin Amash warns the Libertarian Party against nominating a "squishy Republican" at LibertyCon, a comment widely seen as directed at 2016 vice-presidential nominee and presumptive frontrunner Bill Weld.
 January 21: Former Starbucks CEO Howard Schultz, who had been suggested as a Libertarian candidate, makes clear that any presidential run by him would be as an independent.
 January 22: McAfee announces via Twitter that he would be continuing his campaign "in exile", following reports that he, his wife, and four of his campaign staff were being indicted for tax-related felonies by the Internal Revenue Service (IRS). McAfee indicated that he was in "international waters", and had previously tweeted that he was on his way to Venezuela. The IRS has not commented on the alleged indictments.
 January 23: McAfee confirmed on Twitter that he had docked in the Bahamas, where he would remain for the foreseeable future.
 January 30: Podcaster and software engineer Dan Behrman files to run.
 February 5: Weld, who had served as Gary Johnson's running mate in 2016, is the subject of rumours that he had left the Libertarian Party and rejoined the Republican Party to challenge Donald Trump in the Republican primary.
 February 15:
 Weld confirmed the rumors that he had left the Libertarian Party on February 15 by announcing the formation of an exploratory committee for the Republican nomination. Weld officially launched his campaign for the Republican nomination on April 15.
 Justin Amash declines to rule out running for the Libertarian nomination.
 April 1: Software engineer and former naval officer Sam Robb files to run.
 April 22: Larry Sharpe, who had been a candidate for vice president in 2016 and the nominee for Governor of New York in 2018, told The Niagara Gazette that he was unlikely to run for office in 2020, and was instead looking at running for Governor again in 2022.
 May 3: Souraya Faas files to run.
 May 10: Former U.S. Coast Guard officer Ken Armstrong announces his candidacy.
 May 18: Congressman Justin Amash broke ranks with the Republican Party and became the first Republican in all of Congress to call for impeachment proceedings against President Donald Trump. In an interview with Salon, Libertarian National Committee chairman Nicholas Sarwark concurred with Amash's conclusions, saying, "of all the members of Congress, his [Amash] positions seem to most closely match those of the Libertarian Party.", fuelling speculations about a possible bid by Amash for the Libertarian nomination On May 22, Sharpe reported receiving two calls from "people close to Amash" inquiring about the Libertarian Party.
 May 23: Entrepreneur Erik Gerhardt files to run.
 June 30: New Hampshire state representative Max Abramson announces his candidacy for the Libertarian nomination.
 July 4: Amash announces via an op-ed in The Washington Post that he had left the Republican Party, becoming an independent.
 August 22: Former Rhode Island governor Lincoln Chafee, who announced he had joined the Libertarian Party in a Boston Globe op-ed published in July, expressed interest in making another bid for the presidency, this time as a Libertarian.
 October 29: Founder and president of the Future of Freedom Foundation Jacob Hornberger filed to seek the Libertarian nomination for president, announcing his candidacy days later.
 November 2: At the South Carolina Libertarian Party convention, 1996 vice presidential nominee Jo Jorgensen announces her candidacy seeking the nomination for president. Jorgensen participated in the subsequent presidential debate held off the convention site.
 December 20: Podcaster and satirist Mark Whitney announces his campaign.

2020 
  January 5: Former Governor and Senator Lincoln Chafee files to run.
 January 11:
 Vermin Supreme wins the Libertarian Party of New Hampshire's internally-held and funded presidential preference primary.
 Kim Ruff suspends her campaign.
 January 27: 2010 Georgia gubernatorial nominee John Monds files to run.
 February 8: Jacob Hornberger wins the Libertarian Party of Iowa's internally-held and funded presidential preference caucus.
 February 25: Jacob Hornberger wins the Libertarian Party of Minnesota's internally-held presidential preference caucus.
 March 3;
 None of the above wins the North Carolina Libertarian presidential primary.
 Jacob Hornberger wins the California Libertarian presidential primary.
 Vermin Supreme wins the Massachusetts Libertarian presidential primary.
 Max Abramson announces his departure from the Libertarian Party, ending his bid for the party's presidential nomination.
 March 4: John McAfee suspends his presidential campaign and announces his candidacy for the Libertarian vice-presidential nomination, endorsing Vermin Supreme for president.
 March 5: McAfee resumes his presidential campaign.
 March 10: Jacob Hornberger wins the unopposed Missouri primary.
 April 5: Lincoln Chafee suspends his campaign.
 April 11: Hornberger wins the Ohio caucus.
 April 13: Judge Jim Gray announces his candidacy, with Larry Sharpe as his running mate.
 April 24: Mark Whitney suspends his campaign and endorses Gray.
 April 26: In response to the COVID-19 pandemic, the JW Marriott Downtown Austin cancels all reservations for the 2020 Libertarian National Convention.
 April 28;
 Hornberger wins the Connecticut primary.
 Justin Amash opens a presidential exploratory committee for the Libertarian nomination.
 April 29: Ken Armstrong announces that he will withdraw from the presidential race and instead seek the nomination for vice president, following Amash's declaration for the Presidential nomination.
 May 9: The Libertarian Party of Kentucky sponsors the 5th in a series of televised debates held by the state party, featuring the top four vote-getting candidates from previous debates, Hornberger, Supreme, Jorgensen, and Jim Gray, plus Justin Amash.
 May 11: Ken Armstrong endorses Amash.
 May 12: Jo Jorgensen wins the Nebraska primary with 28% of the vote.
 May 16: Despite forming an exploratory committee, Justin Amash announces that he will not seek the 2020 presidential nomination.
 May 22: The 2020 Libertarian National Convention begins online, set to run digitally from May 22–24.
 May 23;
 In the nominating round, Blevins, Vohra, McAfee, Dunham, Gerhardt, Faas, Robb, and Behrman are eliminated. Vohra endorses Kokesh, Robb endorses Jorgensen, and Faas and Behrman endorse Supreme. (Behrman nevertheless announces he will continue his presidential run as an independent.)
 In subsequent rounds, Kokesh, Gray, Monds, Supreme, and Hornberger are eliminated. All of them subsequently endorse Jorgensen.
 The Libertarian Party officially nominates Jo Jorgensen as its presidential candidate, making her the party's first female presidential nominee.
 May 24: The Libertarian Party nominates Spike Cohen as its vice presidential nominee.

Overview

Endorsements

Primaries and caucuses 
The Libertarian Party will be eligible to participate in presidential primaries in numerous states.
 January 11: The Libertarian Party of New Hampshire announced the results of its party-funded presidential preference primary, conducted by mail and in-person at the state convention through January 10.
 February 8: The Libertarian Party of Iowa conducted its own caucuses.
 February 25: The Libertarian Party of Minnesota conducted its own caucuses a week before that of the Democratic and Republican primaries in Minnesota.
 March 3: California, Massachusetts, and North Carolina primaries
 March 10: Missouri primary
 March 16–April 11: The Libertarian Party of Ohio conducted its own online caucuses.
 April 18-May 1: The Libertarian Party of Maine conducted its own online convention.
 April 25–28: The Libertarian Party of Connecticut conducted its own online primary.
 April 28: New York primary
 May 12: Nebraska primary
 May 22: 2020 Libertarian National Convention
 June 2: New Mexico primary

Other primaries and caucuses
 Cancellations: Arizona

Ballot access 

Candidates listed in italics have suspended their campaigns.

Results

Debates and forums

Schedule

Debates

Forums

Primary election polling

National polling

National polling of delegates to the Convention
Both of these polls were conducted using ranked choice voting, progression down the table indicates later rounds of voting as the candidate with the lowest total is eliminated.

Online straw polls 
The following are early unofficial online polls that have included various speculative and potential candidates, including some that are not members of the Libertarian Party.

Campaign finance 
This is an overview of the money used by each campaign as it is reported to the Federal Election Commission (FEC) and released on October 15, 2019. Totals raised include loans from the candidate and transfers from other campaign committees. Some of the Libertarian candidates have not filed with the FEC, and financial data for those candidates are therefore not available.

See also
 2020 United States presidential election

National Conventions
 2020 Libertarian National Convention
 2020 Republican National Convention
 2020 Democratic National Convention
 2020 Green National Convention
 2020 Constitution Party National Convention

Presidential primaries
 2020 Republican Party presidential primaries
 2020 Democratic Party presidential primaries
 2020 Green Party presidential primaries
 2020 Constitution Party presidential primaries

Notes

References

External links 
Official campaign websites
 Max Abramson for President 
 Sorinne Ardeleanu for President
 Ken Armstrong for President
 Dan "Taxation is Theft" Behrman for President
 Lincoln Chafee for President 
 Keenan Wallace Dunham for President 
 Erik Gerhardt for President
 Jacob Hornberger for President
 Jo Jorgensen for President
 Adam Kokesh for President 
 John McAfee for President
 John Monds for President 
 Sam Robb for President 
 Vermin Supreme for President 
 Mark Whitney for President
 Arvin Vohra for President